Assistant Secretary of State for International Narcotics and Law Enforcement Affairs is a position of the United States government within the Department of State that heads the Bureau of International Narcotics and Law Enforcement Affairs, which is responsible for development of policies and programs to combat international narcotics and crime. The current acting Assistant Secretary is Principal Deputy Assistant Secretary James A. Walsh.

On October 1, 1978, Congress, in the Foreign Relations Authorization Act for fiscal Year 1979, authorized the position of Assistant Secretary of State for International Narcotics Matters, to be responsible for the overall coordination of the role of the Department of State in the international aspects of narcotics problems. This title had been given in full in each appointee's commission. The new Assistant Secretary, who headed the Bureau for International Narcotics Matters, replaced a Senior Adviser to the Secretary of State on Narcotics, who had served with a rank equivalent to an Assistant Secretary of State since 1971. The Department of State first supported the Department of the Treasury's Bureau of Narcotics in 1909. The title of this position was changed from International Narcotics Matters to International Narcotics and Law Enforcement Affairs on February 10, 1995.

List of Assistant Secretaries of State for International Narcotics Matters, 1979–1995

List of Assistant Secretaries of State for International Narcotics and Law Enforcement Affairs, 1995–present
The title "Assistant Secretary of State for International Narcotics Matters" was renamed "Assistant Secretary of State for International Narcotics and Law Enforcement Affairs" on February 10, 1995.

References

External links
Official website
www.state.gov Bureau for International Narcotics and Law Enforcement Affairs
The Office of the Historian's list of former Assistant Secretaries

 
Drug policy of the United States